Lechința may refer to the following places in Romania:

 Lechința, a commune in Bistrița-Năsăud County
 Lechința, a village in the commune Iernut, Mureș County
 Lechința, a village in the commune Călinești-Oaș, Satu Mare County
 Lechința (Dipșa), a river in Bistrița-Năsăud County
 Lechința (Mureș), a river in Bistrița-Năsăud and Mureș Counties